Pereslavsky Uyezd (Переславский уезд) was one of the subdivisions of the Vladimir Governorate of the Russian Empire. It was situated in the western part of the governorate. Its administrative centre was Pereslavl-Zalessky.

Demographics
At the time of the Russian Empire Census of 1897, Pereslavsky Uyezd had a population of 87,337. Of these, 99.9% spoke Russian and 0.1% Yiddish as their native language.

References

 
Uezds of Vladimir Governorate
Vladimir Governorate